Dalia Sportive de Grombalia, also known as DSG, is a Tunisian basketball club from Grombalia. Founded in 1993, the team plays in the Championnat National A. The club won its first trophy in 2006, when it won the Tunisian Cup.

Honours
Tunisian Basketball Cup
Winners: 2006

Players

Notable players

 Rolly Fula
 Nenad Zivčević
 Willy Kouassi

External links
Facebook page

Basketball teams in Tunisia
Basketball teams established in 1993